The Chinese Muslim Youth League or Chinese Islamic Youth Association is an organization of Chinese Muslims in the Republic of China.

History
Chinese Muslim Youth League was established with the name Chinese Muslim Youth Cultural Improvement Association in early 1930s in Mukden during the Second Sino-Japanese War to unite Muslim young men for the war against Imperial Japanese Army and Japanese puppet state of Manchukuo.

During the late 1940s of Chinese Civil War, many members of Chinese Muslim Youth Cultural Improvement Association migrated to Kwangtung Province. In July 1949 at Canton, the association reorganized themselves with other interested Muslim groups and forming the Chinese Muslim Youth Anti-Communist and Nation-Building League. Later in that year the league left Kwangtung and moved to Taiwan. In 1957, the league adopted its present name, the Chinese Muslim Youth League.

Activities
The league built and runs the Taipei Cultural Mosque, in which it becomes the group headquarters. It requires formal registration of its membership. In mid-1969, it recorded 560 members, including 55 Taiwanese converts. Most of the members live in and around Taipei, and some are scattered around Taiwan.

Religious identification of Chinese Muslim Youth League is often denied by the Chinese Muslim Association members who call them heretical. In the view of Muslims who live in the non-Islamic areas but intend to keep the Muslim faith, the Chinese Muslim Youth League makes too many compromises with the infidels. This principal reason is the reason for their isolation from the Islamic world.

Although the organization never actively sponsor any Islamic missionary work, they still host some conversions, mostly for marriage reason. In general, the league feels that they have more appeal to younger and more progressive groups. It conducts regular classes for younger people and stresses instruction in Islamic law and theology rather than in Arabic language and ceremonial concerns.

See also
 Islam in Taiwan
 List of mosques in Taiwan
 Chinese Islamic Cultural and Educational Foundation
 Taiwan Halal Integrity Development Association

References

Islamic organizations based in Taiwan
Youth organizations based in Taiwan
Islamic youth organizations
1930s establishments in China
Youth organizations established in the 1930s
Anti-communist organizations
Islamic organizations established in the 1930s
Organizations based in Taipei